The 1951 North Indian Ocean cyclone season was part of the annual cycle of tropical cyclone formation. The season has no official bounds but cyclones tend to form between April and December. These dates conventionally delimit the period of each year when most tropical cyclones form in the northern Indian Ocean. There are two main seas in the North Indian Ocean—the Bay of Bengal to the east of the Indian subcontinent and the Arabian Sea to the west of India. The official Regional Specialized Meteorological Centre in this basin is the India Meteorological Department (IMD), while the Joint Typhoon Warning Center (JTWC) releases unofficial advisories. An average of five tropical cyclones form in the North Indian Ocean every season with peaks in May and November. Cyclones occurring between the meridians 45°E and 100°E are included in the season by the IMD.

Like in the previous season, most of the storms formed in the season are weak, as four of the fifteen tropical depressions formed intensified to become tropical cyclones. However, unlike the previous season, two severe cyclonic storms formed during the season.

Season summary

Systems

Cyclonic Storm One

Depression Two

Depression Three

Depression Four

Depression Five

Cyclonic Storm Six

Depression Seven

Depression Eight

Depression Nine

Depression Ten

Land Depression Eleven

Depression Twelve

Severe Cyclonic Storm Thirteen

Depression Fourteen

Severe Cyclonic Storm Fifteen

See also 
 Australian region cyclone seasons: 1950–51 1951–52
 South Pacific cyclone seasons: 1950–51 1951–52
 South-West Indian Ocean cyclone seasons: 1950–51 1951–52

References

External links
India Meteorological Department
Joint Typhoon Warning Center 

North Indian Ocean cyclone seasons
Tropical cyclones in India
1951 in India